Charlotte E. Coles is a British oncologist and professor at the University of Cambridge Her research focuses on using personalised radiation therapy for people with breast cancer. In 2019 she was awarded a Research Professorship at the National Institute for Health Research (NIHR).

She also worked as the Editor-in-Chief of Elsevier's Clinical Oncology from 2015 until 2021.

References

External links 

 Profile on the website Oncology Forum
 Leading a worldwide new approach to breast cancer - article about her research
 Interview in the Cambridge Independent

Year of birth missing (living people)
Living people
Academics of the University of Cambridge
British oncologists
Women oncologists
NIHR Research Professors